The Lyon Tablet is an ancient bronze tablet that bears the transcript of a speech given by the Roman emperor Claudius. The surviving bottom portion of the tablet was discovered in 1528 by a draper in his vineyard on Croix-Rousse Hill (on the site of the Sanctuary of the Three Gauls) in Lyon, France. It currently resides in the Gallo-Roman Museum of Lyon.

Claudius had particular affinities with Lugdunum (Lyon). He was born there, and it housed the Imperial cult centre: as both Emperor and a "native" of the city, he was probably seen as its patron. He made the inscribed speech before the Roman Senate in 48 AD. It was a proposal to allow monied, landed citizens from further Gaul to enter the Senatorial class, and thus the Senate itself, once they had reached the necessary level of wealth. His argument evoked the Sabine origins of his own family, the gens Claudia, and the recent promotion to senatorial rank of men from Gallia Narbonensis.

The text gives important insight into both the character of Claudius and Senate-emperor relations. Claudius goes into a long-winded digression on the early history of Rome – one which shows the effect of his tutelage under the historian Livy. This kind of pedantry is characteristic of Claudius and immediately identifies him as the speaker. Several interjections by senators are also recorded, mostly urging Claudius to get to the point. The style and substance of the speech suggest that Claudius was willing to publish himself as a scholarly, pedantic, tolerant upholder of ancient senatorial rights and values, eager to extend the same privileges to worthy provincials. The speech also contains references to other events during Claudius' reign, such as the fall of Valerius Asiaticus, whom Claudius singles out for condemnation. In his Annals, the later historian Tacitus reports a different version of the speech, probably based on various sources – including senatorial records – coupled with his own observations and the analysis of hindsight. His text broadly reaches the same conclusions but otherwise differs considerably from the version presented in the Lyon tablet, which includes many circumstantial details and may have been a verbatim transcript from an original Senate document.

The proposal was carried by the Senate. The elite of Lugdunum may have had the tablet made to celebrate their new status and as a demonstration of their gratitude. Claudius is known to have visited the city in 43 AD and in 47 AD.

References

External links
Original Latin text of the Lyon Tablet (from The Latin Library)
Original Latin text of the Lyon Tablet with notes in English - via Internet Archive
Original Latin text of Tacitus' report of Claudius' speech (beginning from "maiores mei, quorum")
An English translation of the second half of the Lyon Tablet
An English translation of Tacitus' report of Claudius' speech

1st-century artifacts
40s in the Roman Empire
1st-century inscriptions
1st-century texts
1528 archaeological discoveries
Ancient Roman government
Latin inscriptions
Claudius
Bronze objects
Roman Lyon